Thioredoxin domain-containing protein 2 is a protein that in humans is encoded by the TXNDC2 gene.

References

Further reading